Yantarogekko is an extinct genus of gecko known from a single specimen found trapped in Eocene-aged Baltic amber The remains consist of the anterior half of a body with partially preserved limbs (including preserved toe pads on one limb), lacking a skeleton. While considered in its initial description to be a member of the family Gekkonidae, the limited nature of known remains combined with its morphology not closely resembling any living family of geckos make it impossible to assign it any more precisely than Gekkonoidea.

References 

Geckos
Paleogene lizards
Fossil taxa described in 2005